Álafoss (eel falls) is a waterfall on the river Varmá in Mosfellsbær, Iceland.

In culture 
A wool factory of the same name has adjoined the waterfall since 1896, when a local farmer imported machinery to process wool using the energy from the waterfall. 

During World War II, barracks were constructed there for British soldiers. Álafoss played a major role in the founding and growth of the town of Mosfellsbær. 

The band Sigur Rós has a studio named Sundlaugin at Álafoss, and the otherwise untitled fifth track on the band's album is nicknamed after the area.

Mosfellsbær is also home to a football club named after the waterfall, Álafoss Football Club.

External links
 Álafoss Official website of the Álafoss Wool store and art gallery.
 
 Sundlaugin Recording Studio

Waterfalls of Iceland